The Rickenbacker Causeway is a causeway that connects Miami, Florida to the barrier islands of Virginia Key and Key Biscayne across Biscayne Bay.

Background 
The Causeway is a toll road, owned and operated by Miami-Dade County. Automobiles traveling southbound from Miami pay a toll of US$2.25  as of 2018; northbound traffic is not charged any toll. Tolls are collected via Sunpass; C-Pass transponders or cash are no longer accepted.

In July 2021, Mayor Daniella Levine Cava proposed a renovation of major parts of the causeway including replacement of the Bear Cut Bridge and improvements to cyclist safety, recreation, and sustainability as part of a public private partnership. The Village of Key Biscayne, for which the causeway is the only ingress and egress to Miami, is participating in the process.

Also known as (unsigned) State Road 913 west of the toll plaza, the causeway's northbound continuation is a flyover ramp with forks to northbound Interstate 95 (unsigned SR 9A) and southbound South Dixie Highway (US 1/unsigned SR 5); the southbound continuation is Crandon Boulevard, which extends roughly five miles through the center of Key Biscayne, terminating near the Cape Florida Lighthouse in Bill Baggs Cape Florida State Park.

Named after Eddie Rickenbacker, the American World War I flying ace and founder and president of Miami-based Eastern Air Lines, the causeway provides access to the Miami Seaquarium, the University of Miami Rosenstiel School of Marine and Atmospheric Science,  MAST Academy, Virginia Key Park, and Miami Marine Stadium on Virginia Key, and to Crandon Park, the Village of Key Biscayne, and Bill Baggs Cape Florida State Park on the island of Key Biscayne.

History 

Talk of a bridge to Key Biscayne, inspired by the bridges connecting Miami to Miami Beach, started in 1926. The northern two-thirds of Key Biscayne was owned by William John “W.J.” Matheson, who had established a coconut plantation on the island. In February 1926 Matheson entered into an agreement with land developer D. P. Davis to develop and re-sell the northern half of Key Biscayne, including all of what is now Crandon Park and about half of the present Village of Key Biscayne. Later in 1926 the City of Coral Gables incorporated with Key Biscayne included in its boundaries. There were dreams of a bridge to the island, making Key Biscayne the seaside resort for Coral Gables that Miami Beach had become for Miami.

Obstacles to the project soon appeared. In March 1926 the U.S. government auctioned off some lots on Key Biscayne that had been retained when the rest of the island was transferred to the State of Florida. The Mathesons wanted to have clear title to all of their land, and determined to outbid other interested parties for the land. Then, on September 18, 1926, the Great Miami Hurricane crossed over Key Biscayne on its way to Miami. While there were no deaths on the island, most of the buildings on Key Biscayne were destroyed or badly damaged, and many of the plantings were lost, including half of the coconut trees. D. P. Davis was not able to meet his end of the contract; he declared bankruptcy and then disappeared en route to Europe by ship. The Florida Land Boom was over, as were plans for a bridge.

William Matheson died in 1930, leaving the island to his children. There was a flurry of interest in 1939, when the U.S. Navy approved a proposal to develop Virginia Key as an air base and sea port. There was even talk of putting an air base on the north end of Key Biscayne, as well. In 1940 William Matheson's heirs donated  of land (including two miles (3.2 km) of beach on the Atlantic Ocean) on the northern end of Key Biscayne to Dade County to be used as a public park (Crandon Park). The county commissioner who negotiated the gift, Charles H. Crandon, had offered for the county to build a causeway to Key Biscayne in exchange for the land donation. Planning for the air and sea complex on Virginia Key was still proceeding, and construction on a causeway to Virginia Key started in 1941. The Attack on Pearl Harbor and the entry of the United States into World War II stopped all work on the causeway and the development of Virginia Key.

After the war Crandon pushed on with the project. He got financier Ed Ball to buy $6 million worth of bonds financing the construction of the causeway. Land for the toll plaza and the causeway entrance was bought from the estate of James Deering. Fill dredged from the bottom of Biscayne Bay and dug from the mainland were used as both the road bed and public beach areas, both to the west of Virginia Beach and on the southern reaches of the island.

In the late 1960s and 1970s the sites along the Rickenbacker Causeway continued to increase in popularity.  After increasing in the mid 1960 because of the American television series Flipper, attendance to the Miami Seaquarium soared in 1968 when it started to display Hugo, its first killer whale (two years later, Lolita became their second. The two killer whales performed together until Hugo's death in 1980).  Shortly afterward, Planet Ocean, a themed tourist attraction, opened its doors.  Newly integrated beaches were often crowded; the causeway near the drawbridge across the Intracoastal Waterway, and bridgeway near the mainland, became favorite fishing spots.

But popularity had a price: by 1980 it became evident that the concrete and steel structures supporting the roadway west of Virginia Key needed replacement.  Five years later, the high-rise William Powell Bridge and new bridging nearest the toll plaza were built and opened at a cost of $27 million.  With exception of the drawbridge (which was removed) the old bridging was left intact to serve as fishing piers. In 2011, the West Fishing Pier was demolished.

Since the opening of the new bridge, the MAST Academy took over the site of the defunct Planet Ocean (the theme attraction closed in 1991); the Virginia Key site of the City of Miami's garbage dump became a Superfund site for cleanup; the beach at Bill Baggs Cape Florida State Park was gaining in popularity; but the Miami Marine Stadium has been virtually abandoned and the Miami Seaquarium has had a series of setbacks, from being devastated by hurricanes Andrew (1992) and Wilma (2005) and being prevented from expanding by threats of legal action by the newly incorporated Village of Key Biscayne.  On the other hand, the entire length of the causeway, plus Crandon Boulevard, have become part of a popular bicycling route from Key Biscayne to Florida City.

Cycling 
According to the publication CityLab, Miami, Florida is not known as a bicycle-friendly city: It's listed as the fourth most dangerous city to bike in the U.S.; between 2010 and 2014, 47 people were killed cycling through the city. Florida is the state with most cyclist fatalities per capita in United States (the situation is just as bleak for pedestrians).

Although bicycling is very popular on the Rickenbacker Causeway, no physical division between the cars and bikes exist. This lack of separation between bikes and cars, excessive speeds and driving under the influence has contributed to at least four fatalities since 2006. This has spurred many cyclists to push for better bike lanes and barriers to protect them from the high-speed traffic on the bridge. Architect, urban planner, and lifelong cyclist Bernard Zyscovich saw an opportunity to promote cycling as a more viable means of transportation in Miami and launched Plan Z for Miami.

Plan Z For Miami envisions a separated, partly elevated cycle-track that would connect the mainland to the causeway, bridge replacement and roadway elevation to account for future sea level rise as well as a new 20-acre park on Virginia Key created by shifting the roadway north. This pro bono effort by Zyscovich was in response to the death of Aaron Cohen, one of the four cyclists hit by cars on the Rickenbacker Causeway.

It's necessary to clarify that Plan Z isn't just a bike path, although that's perhaps the most striking part of the proposal. As Zyscovich explains, the Rickenbacker Causeway urgently needs structural renovations, including more elevation to help it survive climate change. “There is sea level rise, there is the replacement of the bridge, there is a 20-acre new park,” says the architect. “The bicycle aspect is only one part of the bigger project. But bicycle safety is the basis for beginning to think about it.”

The Rickenbacker Causeway and Crandon Boulevard are Miami-Dade's most popular bike routes for avid cyclists.

The path would then run along the William Powell Bridge, providing an observation deck for viewing the Miami skyline, then continue on to Virginia Key. Zyscovich's plan also imagines a 20-acre waterfront park and beach at the entrance of Virginia Key, with a branch of paths connecting to Virginia Key Park, before continuing on to Key Biscayne.

Zyscovich thinks that Plan Z can kickstart a cultural change in the city. The project could join two other proposed infrastructure projects, a linear park called the Underline and the Ludlam Trail, a rails-to-trail multi-use path. “I think that what we are presenting is a concept large enough to contribute to creating a network,” the architect says. “If we can implement Plan Z, the Underline, and the Ludlam Trail, we are going to have thousands of users that will then become the advocacy group to demand more bicycle infrastructure.”

In May 2017, Miami Dade County reclaimed land on Rickenbacker Causeway to help keep the Plan Z For Miami plan alive, The Miami Herald reported in May 2017.

As of May 2022 Plan Z, is in the limbo after receiving very significant backslash from the Key Biscayne community as it incurs in an up to 80 year rights forfeiture to the Plan Z developers thus creating many uncertainties for the residents of the island who are not keen to have their only road to the mainland be dependent on a third party for no significant value to the island community.

References 

Roads in Miami
Key Biscayne, Florida
Roads in Miami-Dade County, Florida
Causeways in Miami-Dade County, Florida
Toll bridges in Florida
Intracoastal Waterway
Bridges completed in 1947
Road bridges in Florida
Concrete bridges in the United States
1947 establishments in Florida